Arthur Reeves (1892–1954) was an American cinematographer active in the silent and early sound era. He began his career at the Chicago-based Essanay and went on to work for a variety of other studios including Metro, Universal and FBO Pictures.

Selected filmography

 The Alster Case (1915)
 The Misleading Lady (1916)
 That Sort (1916)
 The Havoc (1916)
 The Small Town Guy (1917)
 Two-Bit Seats (1917)
 Ruggles of Red Gap (1918)
 A Pair of Sixes (1918)
 The Misfit Wife (1920)
 The Greater Claim (1921)
 Any Night (1922)
 Out of the Silent North (1922)
 The Man Who Married His Own Wife (1922)
 The Galloping Kid (1922)
 Afraid to Fight (1922)
 Ashes (1922)
 Wild Bill Hickok (1923)
 Pride of Sunshine Alley (1924)
 Galloping Vengeance (1925)
 The Range Terror (1925)
 The Bloodhound (1925)
 That Man Jack! (1925)
 The Fighting Boob (1926)
 The Dead Line (1926)
 Man Rustlin' (1926)
 The Test of Donald Norton (1926)
 The Power of the Weak (1926)
 The Mile-a-Minute Man (1926)
 Broadway Madness (1927)
 The Arizona Whirlwind (1927)
 A Bowery Cinderella (1927)
 Satan and the Woman (1928)
 The Stronger Will (1928)
 Women Who Dare (1928)
 Untamed Justice (1929)
 The Phantom of the North (1929)
 The Swellhead (1930)
 Wings of Adventure (1930)
 Sunny Skies (1930)
 The Medicine Man (1930)
 Sunny (1930)

References

Bibliography
 Morris, Peter. Embattled Shadows: A History of Canadian Cinema, 1895-1939. McGill-Queen's Press - MQUP, 1992.
 Soister, John T., Nicolella, Henry & Joyce, Steve. American Silent Horror, Science Fiction and Fantasy Feature Films, 1913-1929. McFarland, 2014.

External links

1892 births
1954 deaths
American cinematographers
People from Illinois